WLIN is a talk/sports formatted broadcast radio station affiliated with CBS Sports Radio.

WLIN is licensed to Waynesboro, Pennsylvania, serving the Waynesboro/Chambersburg area. WLIN is owned and operated by VerStandig Broadcasting.

History
The WCBG calls were on AM 1590 until January 1, 2005. VerStandig Broadcasting "donated" the station to Emmanuel Baptist Temple after a very public battle over the station's tower, which was in Chambersburg city limits. On January 1, WCBG switched calls with then sister WHGT and moved all programming to AM 1380 and AM 1590 fell silent. AM 1590 would remain silent until December 4, 2005.

In the 1950s, its earlier call "WAYZ" was owned by Richard Field Lewis Jr. (1907–1957), owner of the Richard Field Lewis Jr. Stations (later Mid Atlantic Network Inc.).

AM 1380 spent years as country formatted WAYZ, later gaining an FM station at 101.5 (today WAYZ resides at FM 104.7). WAYZ changed calls in 1992 to WHGT pending a format change that never happened. When country WAYZ moved to FM 104.7 in 2000, AM 1380 changed to simulcasting then classic hits "Star 92.1" WSRT. In 2006 when FM 92.1 changed format to CHR as "The Point", sister AM WCBG was sold and the calls and talk format moved to AM 1380.

On August 12, 2019, the station changed its call sign to WLIN. On August 15, 2019, WLIN changed their format from ESPN sports to talk/sports, branded as "The Line" to match the new call sign.

References

External links
The Line 100.9 & 1380 Facebook
Official website

LIN (AM)
Franklin County, Pennsylvania
Radio stations established in 1953
Talk radio stations in the United States
Sports radio stations in the United States